Qadir Khan Mandokhail (Urdu: قادر خان مندوخیل) is a Pakistani politician who has been a member of the National Assembly of Pakistan since 30 April 2021. He is a member of Pakistan Peoples Party.

Political career

2018 elections 
In 2018, Mandokhail contested from NA-249 (Karachi West-II). However, Mandokhail failed to win as he received only 7,236 votes and lost by 28,108 votes.

2021 by-elections 
He contested the by-election in constituency NA-249 (Karachi West-II) on 29 April 2021. The main competition in the constituency was going on between PSP, PML(N) and TLP. Pakistan Peoples Party were on the fourth position. All of a sudden the lights in Baldia went out and the results didn't come out. After some hours, Pakistan Peoples Party's candidate Qadir Khan Mandokhail was on the first, with Miftah Ismail in second, TLP in third and PSP were fourth. The final results were Mandokhail securing 16,156 votes and defeating the PML-N candidate Miftah Ismail by a margin of only 600 votes. Pak Sarzameen Party and Pakistan Muslim League (N) leaders claimed that the elections were rigged.

References

Pakistani politicians 
Members of the National Assembly of Pakistan
Living people
Year of birth missing (living people)